Iraniplectus bakhtiari is an extinct relative of modern-day pufferfish and porcupine fish from the Middle Oligocene of Iran.  It is closely related to the Eocene Zignoichthys.

References 

Prehistoric ray-finned fish genera
Oligocene fish
Tetraodontiformes
Fossils of Iran
Fossil taxa described in 2006